Tinashe Kamunhukamwe (born 10 July 1995) is a Zimbabwean cricketer. He made his international debut for the Zimabwbwe cricket team in July 2018.

Domestic career
He made his Twenty20 debut for Zimbabwe against Eastern Province in the 2016 Africa T20 Cup on 30 September 2016. In February 2017, he was named in an academy squad by Zimbabwe Cricket to tour England later that year.

He made his List A debut for Rising Stars in the 2017–18 Pro50 Championship on 17 April 2018. He was the leading run-scorer during the tournament, with 379 runs in nine matches.

In September 2018, he was named in Zimbabwe's squad for the 2018 Africa T20 Cup tournament. In December 2020, he was selected to play for the Eagles in the 2020–21 Logan Cup.

International career
In June 2018, he was named in a Board XI team for warm-up fixtures ahead of the 2018 Zimbabwe Tri-Nation Series. Later the same month, he was named in a 22-man preliminary Twenty20 International (T20I) squad for the tri-nation series. The following month, he was named in Zimbabwe's One Day International (ODI) squad for their series against Pakistan. He made his One Day International (ODI) debut for Zimbabwe against Pakistan on 20 July 2018.

In June 2019, he was named in Zimbabwe's ODI and T20I squads for their series against the Netherlands. In February 2020, he was named in Zimbabwe's ODI and T20I squads for their tour against Bangladesh. He made his T20I debut for Zimbabwe, against Bangladesh, on 9 March 2020.

References

External links
 

1995 births
Living people
Zimbabwean cricketers
Zimbabwe One Day International cricketers
Zimbabwe Twenty20 International cricketers
Rising Stars cricketers
Sportspeople from Mashonaland East Province